Laetitia Chapeh Yimga (born 7 April 1987) is a footballer who plays as a defender for French Régional 1 club FF Douaisis. Born in Cameroon, she played for Equatorial Guinea at the 2011 FIFA Women's World Cup.

References

External links

1987 births
Living people
Footballers from Douala
Cameroonian women's footballers
Women's association football defenders
Medyk Konin players
Gintra Universitetas players
Lille OSC (women) players
Division 1 Féminine players
Cameroonian expatriate women's footballers
Cameroonian expatriate sportspeople in Poland
Expatriate women's footballers in Poland
Cameroonian expatriate sportspeople in Lithuania
Expatriate women's footballers in Lithuania
Cameroonian expatriate sportspeople in France
Expatriate women's footballers in France
Cameroonian emigrants to Equatorial Guinea
Naturalized citizens of Equatorial Guinea
Equatoguinean women's footballers
Equatorial Guinea women's international footballers
2011 FIFA Women's World Cup players